The 2021 Poker Masters was the sixth season of the Poker Masters. It took place from September 7-19, 2021, from the PokerGO Studio at ARIA Resort & Casino in Las Vegas, Nevada. There were 12 events on the schedule including nine No-Limit Hold'em, two Pot-Limit Omaha, and one 8-Game event. Buy-ins ranged from $10,000 to the $100,000 Main Event. Final tables were streamed on PokerGO.

Michael Addamo won the final two events, including the $100,000 Main Event, to earn the Purple Jacket as series champion.

Schedule 
The schedule for the 2021 Poker Masters included nine No-Limit Hold'em tournaments, two Pot-Limit Omaha tournaments, and an 8-Game event. 8-Game is a rotation of H.O.R.S.E., No-Limit Hold'em, Pot-Limit Omaha, and 2-7 Triple Draw.

Purple Jacket standings 

The 2021 Poker Masters awarded the Purple Jacket to the player that accumulated the most PokerGO Tour points during the series.

Results

Event #1: $10,000 No-Limit Hold'em 

 2-Day Event: September 7-8, 2021
 Number of Entrants: 82
 Total Prize Pool: $820,000
 Number of Payouts: 12
 Winning Hand:

Event #2: $10,000 No-Limit Hold'em 

 2-Day Event: September 8-9, 2021
 Number of Entrants: 86
 Total Prize Pool: $860,000
 Number of Payouts: 13
 Winning Hand:

Event #3: $10,000 Pot-Limit Omaha 

 2-Day Event: September 9-10, 2021
 Number of Entrants: 69
 Total Prize Pool: $690,000
 Number of Payouts: 10
 Winning Hand:

Event #4: $10,000 No-Limit Hold'em 

 2-Day Event: September 10-11, 2021
 Number of Entrants: 73
 Total Prize Pool: $730,000
 Number of Payouts: 11
 Winning Hand:

Event #5: $10,000 No-Limit Hold'em 

 2-Day Event: September 11-12, 2021
 Number of Entrants: 66
 Total Prize Pool: $660,000
 Number of Payouts: 10
 Winning Hand:

Event #6: $10,000 8-Game 

 2-Day Event: September 12-13, 2021
 Number of Entrants: 30
 Total Prize Pool: $300,000
 Number of Payouts: 5
 Winning Hand:  (Razz)

Event #7: $10,000 No-Limit Hold'em 

 2-Day Event: September 13-14, 2021
 Number of Entrants: 68
 Total Prize Pool: $680,000
 Number of Payouts: 10
 Winning Hand:

Event #8: $25,000 No-Limit Hold'em 

 2-Day Event: September 14-15, 2021
 Number of Entrants: 57
 Total Prize Pool: $1,425,000
 Number of Payouts: 9
 Winning Hand:

Event #9: $25,000 Pot-Limit Omaha 

 2-Day Event: September 15-16, 2021
 Number of Entrants: 43
 Total Prize Pool: $1,075,000
 Number of Payouts: 7
 Winning Hand:

Event #10: $25,000 No-Limit Hold'em 

 2-Day Event: September 16-17, 2021
 Number of Entrants: 38
 Total Prize Pool: $950,000
 Number of Payouts: 6
 Winning Hand:

Event #11: $50,000 No-Limit Hold'em 

 2-Day Event: September 17-18, 2021
 Number of Entrants: 34
 Total Prize Pool: $1,700,000
 Number of Payouts: 5
 Winning Hand:

Event #12: $100,000 No-Limit Hold'em 

 2-Day Event: September 18-19, 2021
 Number of Entrants: 29
 Total Prize Pool: $2,900,000
 Number of Payouts: 5
 Winning Hand:

References

External links 

 Results

Poker tournaments
Television shows about poker
2021 in poker
2021 in sports in Nevada